Strines railway station serves the village of Strines, in the Metropolitan Borough of Stockport, on the outskirts of Greater Manchester, England.   Until boundary changes in 1994, the station itself lay over the border in Derbyshire.

History

The Marple, New Mills and Hayfield Junction Railway (MNM&HJ) was formed in 1860 and its line between New Mills with  opened on 1 July 1865. Originally there were no intermediate stations, but one was opened at Strines in August 1866. The MNM&HJ was leased to and worked by the Manchester, Sheffield and Lincolnshire Railway (MS&L) from opening, but was absorbed jointly by the MS&L and the Midland Railway following an Act of 24 June 1869. It then became part of the Sheffield and Midland Railway Companies' Committee, an undertaking formed on 6 August 1872. The latter was renamed the Great Central and Midland Joint Railway in the early twentieth century. Originally there were no goods or coal facilities, but the MS&L agreed to these late in 1870. The station had a substantial stone-built booking office and waiting room, with a stationmaster's house. These were considered sufficiently impressive to be used as location shoots for films in the early 1970s. They disappeared when the station became an unstaffed halt in 1973.

Services
The station has a two-hourly daytime service to New Mills and Manchester Piccadilly Monday to Sunday, with additional calls during weekday peak periods.  On Saturdays and Sundays, most eastbound services continue through to Sheffield.

Strines station also serves the nearby hamlet of Turf Lea.

References

External links

Railway stations in the Metropolitan Borough of Stockport
DfT Category F2 stations
Former Great Central and Midland Joint Railway stations
Railway stations in Great Britain opened in 1866
Northern franchise railway stations
1866 establishments in England